Charles Caudrelier (born 26 February 1974) is a French sailor who has sailed in multiple Volvo Ocean Races.

Born in Paris and raised in Brittany, Caudrelier is a merchant navy officer. He won the Solitaire du Figaro, a solo race, in 2004 and also completed the race in 2005 and 2006. He won the Transat Jacques Vabre, a two man race, in 2009 and 2013.

He sailed on Groupama 4 in the 2011–12 Volvo Ocean Race. Groupama won the race.

He skippered the Dongfeng Race Team in the 2014–15 Volvo Ocean Race. Three years later he skippered again the Dongfeng Race Team, and this time they won in the 2017–18 Volvo Ocean Race.

References

External links
 

1974 births
Living people
French male sailors (sport)
Volvo Ocean Race sailors
Sportspeople from Paris
People from Brittany